Riccardo Silva is an Italian businessman and investor. He is owner of Silva International Investments, which has investments in a range of companies across media, sports, entertainment, art, and real estate. He is also co-owner of AC Milan, president and co-owner of Miami FC, owner of the Silva family art collection, and previously served as CEO of the Milan Channel.

Early life and education 
Riccardo Silva was born in 1970 in Milan, the grandson of the founder of Italsilva – Gruppo Desa, one of Italy’s largest chemical groups. His maternal family, Fabbri, is known for its publishing company, Fabbri Editori, which is now part of the RCS Media Group. Silva completed his studies at Bocconi University and Tulane University.

Early career 
In 1998 Riccardo Silva launched MP Web, an internet start-up of the Milan-based Media Partners Group (now Infront Media), managing sports rights and content for mobile and Internet platforms, which first came to prominence in the 1990s.  In 2001 Riccardo Silva became CEO of Milan Channel, the official TV channel of AC Milan football club, and guided the international development of the channel.

MP & Silva 
From 2004 until 2016 Riccardo Silva owned and managed MP & Silva, a global international media rights company based in London. Under Riccardo’s leadership, MP & Silva became the world’s leading distributor of TV rights. In May 2016 Riccardo Silva and his partners sold MP & Silva to the Chinese groups Everbright Securities and Beijing Baofeng Technology, relinquishing management and operational control.

Silva International Investments
In 2016, Silva established Silva International Investments, a portfolio company which invests and manages assets in media, sport, fashion, technology, and real estate.

Since its inception, the company have invested in Mast Capital, a Miami based real estate and development company and has made a number of acquisitions, including a majority stake in Globe Soccer Awards.

In August 2017, Silva International Investments acquired SportBusiness, who provide insight into businesses working in the sports industry throughout the world.

In October 2019, the company acquired the London modeling agency, Select Model Management, and announced a major global expansion driven through an integration with Silva International Investment's existing modelling agency network, MP Management.

Following MP Management's establishment in 2008 in Milan, the company acquired a second agency in Miami in 2014, quickly followed with the acquisition of a third agency, Major Paris, in 2015. Under the ownership of Silva International Investments, the group continued to grow, with the acquisition of Elite Stockholm in 2017, and in the same year, with the establishment of a strategic partnership with Modellink in Gothenburg. This was followed in 2018 with the acquisition of the Factor Chosen Group, which brought into the network agencies in Chicago, Los Angeles and Atlanta. With the acquisition of Select, the network expanded to London, with the group now spanning eight agencies.

Miami FC 
In May 2015, Riccardo Silva co-established Miami FC, which played in the North American Soccer League (NASL).

During their time competing in the NASL, Miami FC captured the 2017 spring NASL title with a 7-0 win over the San Francisco Deltas, and in October of that year, the club completed an historic double, becoming the first team in NASL history to win both the Spring and Autumn titles in the same season. In an interview with El Nuevo Herald Riccardo Silva stated that "The fact that we won the Spring and Autumn tournaments does not mean there are not more things that we have to fight for".

In June 2017, Miami FC played their first competitive fixture against an MLS club, beating Orlando City SC 3-1 in the Lamar Hunt US Open Cup with Stefano Pinho scoring a hat-trick. The Telegraph reported Riccardo Silva saying: “It was the biggest game in our short history so to win so convincingly against a fantastic club like Orlando City was a great result for us".

Miami FC 2 were crowned 2018 NPSL National Champions in August 2018, defeating FC Motown (Morristown, NJ) 3-1 at Drew University’s Ranger Stadium.

In July 2019, Miami FC won its sixth overall trophy, adding the NPSL Sunshine Conference to their list of honors, defeating Miami United FC 3-2 in the final. August 2019 saw Miami FC add more titles to their trophy cabinet, winning the 2019 National Premier Soccer League (NPSL) title by recording a 3-1 victory over New York Cosmos.

In September 2019, the team joined the National Independent Soccer Association (NISA), where they won their ninth trophy by winning the NISA East Coast Championship.

On 11 December 2019, former USL Championship club Ottawa Fury FC announced that it had transferred its franchise rights to Miami FC ownership group, and the club would begin competition in the league in the 2020 season.

In 2018, Miami FC announced the launch of its new Youth Academy Program. Miami FC Youth Academy Program will be dedicated to increasing opportunities for youth soccer players in South Florida to develop their skills and knowledge of the game.

AC Milan 

In August 2022, Riccardo Silva became co-owner of Italian football club AC Milan. He invested in the club in partnership with the US-based fund RedBird and other American investors including the New York Yankees.

Riccardo Silva Stadium 
In 2017, Silva made a $3.76 million donation to cover renovations of the team's home field, FIU Stadium at the Florida International University. It was subsequently announced that the stadium would be renamed Riccardo Silva Stadium for five years in recognition of his involvement.

Other Footballing Interests 

Silva was involved in the project to establish the Americas Champions League (ACL) tournament, which would involve teams from North America, South America and the Caribbean and was intended to become the all-Americas version of Europe’s popular UEFA Champions League. The intention was for a 64-team competition to mirror the UEFA Champions League's format, which Silva estimated could generate $500 million in television and marketing rights - quintupling the current annual take-ins for the CONCACAF Champions League and CONMEBOL's Copa Libertadores combined.

The plans to develop the ACL have been described as ‘a vehicle to help place the country at the forefront of game’, a goal which Silva believes can be achieved.

In 2016, Silva's company, Silva International Investments, commissioned a report by Deloitte, on promotion and relegation in United States professional soccer. The report, published in November 2016, found that promotion and relegation could assist US club soccer in capitalising on the potential for the sport in USA, but also stated it's still too early to consider such a system in the U.S. until some important questions are answered.

In August 2017, Miami FC joined forces with the National Premier Soccer League's Kingston Stockade FC in filing a request for arbitration at the Court of Arbitration for Sport (CAS).

Other business interests 
Silva has other business interests in technology, fashion, and arts, including investments in technology company Muzik. In December 2017, a gallery at the Bass Museum of Art in Miami Beach was re-named the Riccardo and Tatyana Silva Gallery in recognition of the support they have given to the museum and the arts in general. The Bass Museum focuses on exhibitions of international contemporary art; it presents mid-career and established artists reflecting the spirit and international character of Miami Beach. Tatyana sits on the board of directors of the museum.

Personal life 
Riccardo Silva is married to Tatyana Silva, and they have two sons.

References

External links
 RiccardoSilva.com

1970 births
Living people
Italian chief executives
Italian investors
Italian mass media owners
Italian sports agents
North American Soccer League executives
Miami FC
Businesspeople from Milan